Derek Armstrong may refer to:

 Derek Armstrong (ice hockey) (born 1973), Canadian ice hockey coach
 Derek Armstrong (footballer) (born 1939), English former footballer
 Derek Armstrong (gridiron football) (born 1981), Canadian football guard
 Derek Armstrong (politician) (born 1981), American politician